Jonathan Beale is a BBC News reporter. Before joining the BBC in 1999 Beale had been an assistant to a Member of Parliament.
Beale spent two years as the BBC's Brussels correspondent.
He served in Washington DC covering the 2006 midterm elections. In 2009 he covered the Guantanamo military commissions.

In 2005, Beale reported that then President George W. Bush was supporting the followers of the controversial "intelligent design" idea.
This article stirred controversy. As of 2017, Beale is the BBC Defence correspondent.

References

External links
 
 

Living people
BBC newsreaders and journalists
Year of birth missing (living people)